Pest Man Wins is a 1951 short subject directed by Jules White starring American slapstick comedy team The Three Stooges (Moe Howard, Larry Fine and Shemp Howard). It is the 136th entry in the series released by Columbia Pictures starring the comedians, who released 190 shorts for the studio between 1934 and 1959.

Plot
The Stooges are pest exterminators who decide to drum up business by planting mice, moths, and ants in an unsuspecting house. They select a fancy mansion where a high society dinner party is being held. After successfully infesting the house with pests, the trio are predictably hired to clean up their own mess without interrupting the party. One highlight is the piano recital, whereby Johann Strauss II's "Blue Danube Waltz" is being played by party guest/pianist Mr. Philander (Vernon Dent). A chorus of cats replies, bewildering the audience and Mr. Philander. Chaos ensues inside suddenly when a mouse enters the piano, agitating the cats. The Stooges are forced to get the offending pest off the piano, destroying it in the process. After the piano incident passes, the Stooges start loitering around the pastry table. One things leads to another, and a massive pie fight ensues.

Production notes
Pest Man Wins was filmed on February 12–15, 1951. The title is a parody of the expression "the best man wins." It is a remake of 1936's Ants in the Pantry using minimal of stock footage. In addition, pie fight footage was recycled from In the Sweet Pie and Pie and Half-Wits Holiday.

References

External links 
 
 
 Pest Man Wins at threestooges.net

1951 films
1951 comedy films
The Three Stooges films
American black-and-white films
The Three Stooges film remakes
Films directed by Jules White
Columbia Pictures short films
American comedy short films
1950s English-language films
1950s American films